

Group I

Head coach:

Head coach:

Head coach:

Head coach:  Luis Armelio García

Group J

Head coach: Thomas Jordan

Head coach:

Head coach:

Head coach:

Squads
2008